Candace "Candy" Lynn Montgomery (née Wheeler; born November 15, 1949) is an American accused of murdering her lover's wife, Betty Gore. The killing took place in Wylie, Texas, on June 13, 1980. During the assault, Gore was struck 41 times with a wood splitting axe.

Background 
Montgomery, who was 30 years old at the time of the incident, was married to Pat Montgomery, an electrical engineer. The couple had two children—a son and daughter. They moved to Collin County, Texas, in 1977, where they regularly attended the Methodist Church of Lucas. Montgomery became close friends with Gore, a middle school teacher, after meeting her at a church service. Gore lived nearby with her two children and her husband, Allan, with whom Montgomery engaged in an extramarital affair.

On the day of Gore's killing, her husband was out of town. When he was unable to reach his wife on the telephone, he requested that their neighbors go to investigate. After forcing their way into the family residence, they discovered Gore's corpse. Her daughter, Bethany, who had been sleeping in her crib in another room at the time of the incident, was awake and crying.

The crime was investigated by Steve Deffibaugh with the Collin County Sheriff’s Department.

Trial 

Candy Montgomery was represented by civil law attorney Don Crowder and defense attorney Robert Udashen. The trial, over which District Judge Tom Ryan was appointed to preside, was held in McKinney, Texas, and lasted just eight days. Montgomery pled self-defense, alleging that she had defended herself after being attacked by Gore following a confrontation about Montgomery's affair with her husband, Allan. She stated that she was compelled to use an axe after Gore attempted to strike her moments before with the same weapon. 

Montgomery underwent a polygraph test prior to the trial, which indicated that she was being truthful. District attorney Tom O'Connell argued that Montgomery could have fled the scene instead of attacking Gore. He also argued that attacking 41 times was disproportionate. Montgomery was subsequently found not guilty on October 30, 1980, by a jury consisting of nine women and three men.

Reaction after trial 
The verdict received a great deal of criticism from the community. Crowds chanted, "Murderer! Murderer!" as Montgomery exited the courthouse following her acquittal. The victim's father, Bob Pomeroy, said: As far as I'm concerned, justice will be served. She has to live with it ... I wouldn't say I was happy with the verdict. We don't know what happened and we never will know what happened.

Evidence of Love: A True Story of Passion and Death in the Suburbs, a book examining the case and events following the trial, written by Dallas-based journalists John Bloom and Jim Atkinson, was released in January 1984.

Portrayal in film and television 
The 1990 television movie A Killing in a Small Town is based on the case.

Jessica Biel plays Montgomery in the Hulu original series Candy, which debuted in May 2022.

Elizabeth Olsen will play Montgomery in the HBO Max series Love & Death, due for release in April 2023.

References 

Living people
People acquitted of murder
People from Texas
1949 births